The 2013 Australian Manufacturers' Championship was an Australian motor racing series for modified production touring cars. It comprised two CAMS sanctioned national championship titles, the Australian Manufacturers’ Championship (for automobile manufacturers) and the Australian Production Car Championship (for drivers). The 2013 Australian Manufacturers' Championship was the 28th manufacturers title to be awarded by CAMS and the 19th to be contested under the Australian Manufacturers' Championship name. The 2013 Australian Production Car Championship was the 20th Australian Production Car Championship. The Manufacturers title was awarded to Mitsubishi and the Australian Production Car Championship to Garry Holt.

Australian Manufacturers Championship Pty Ltd was appointed by CAMS as the Category Manager for the championship.

Class structure
Cars competed in the following seven classes:
 Class A : Extreme Performance
 Class B : High Performance
 Class C : Performance Touring
 Class D : Production Touring
 Class E : Compact Touring
 Class F : Hybrid/Alternative Energy
 Class I : Invitational

Calendar
The championship was contested over a five-round series.

Points system
Each manufacturer scored points towards the Australian Manufacturers' Championship title from the two highest placed automobiles of its make, in any class (excluding Class I). The title was awarded to the manufacturer that scored the highest total number of class points over all rounds of the championship. 
 In rounds with one scheduled race, points were awarded to manufacturers on a 120–90–72–60–54–48–42–36–30–24–18–12–6 basis for the first thirteen places in each class with 3 points for other finishers.
 In rounds with two scheduled races, points are awarded to manufacturers on a 60–45–36–30–27–24–21–18–15–12–9–6–3 basis for the first thirteen places in each class in each race with 2 points for other finishers.

Points towards the Australian Production Car Championship outright title were awarded to drivers based on outright finishing positions attained in each race. Points were awarded using the same two scales as used for the Australian Manufacturers' Championship with the addition of two points for the driver setting the fastest qualifying lap in each class at each round.

Points towards the Australian Production Car Championship class titles were awarded to drivers based on class finishing positions attained in each race. Points were awarded using the same two scales as used for the Australian Manufacturers' Championship with the addition of two points for the driver setting the fastest qualifying lap in each class at each round.

Results

Australian Manufacturers' Championship

Australian Production Car Championship

Outright

Classes

References

External links
 Natsoft Race Results Archive

Australian Manufacturers' Championship
Australian Production Car Championship
Manufacturers' Championship